Par-e Shushtari (also Romanized as Par-e Shūshtarī) is a village in Jahangiri Rural District, in the Central District of Masjed Soleyman County, Khuzestan Province, Iran. At the 2006 census, its population was 39, in 8 families.

References 

Populated places in Masjed Soleyman County